Eduardo Estrada Palomo  ((Mexico City; May 13, 1962 – Los Angeles; November 6, 2003) was a Mexican actor. Palomo became famous across Mexico and Latin America after his 1993 characterization of Juan del Diablo in Corazón salvaje.

Career
Palomo was born in Mexico City, the son of Jesús Estrada and Miliza Palomo, brother of Jesús Jr. and Susana. He started acting in theatre at the age of 12, and found fame with the success of Corazón Salvaje. He went on to make several other successful telenovelas and films in Mexico. He also recorded an album titled Mover El Tiempo in early 1994.

He was determined not to star in any other telenovelas after Ramona (co-starring with Kate del Castillo), but the sequel to Corazón Salvaje was something he could not refuse. He was working on a Los Angeles production of the play Una Pareja Con Ángel (written by Palomo and previously produced in Mexico) when he died.

Palomo was in the process of "crossing-over" to American television audiences where he guest starred on shows such as Arrested Development and Kingpin and was to star in a CBS series. His last role was in A Day Without a Mexican (2004).

Personal life
Palomo married the singer and actress Carina Ricco on November 26, 1994. They had two children. He moved from his native Mexico to pursue a career in Hollywood, before he died in Los Angeles from a heart attack.

Filmography

Film

Television

Discography
1994: Mover el tiempo

References

External links

 

1962 births
2003 deaths
Mexican male film actors
Mexican male telenovela actors
Male actors from Mexico City
Mexican Scientologists